mailx is a Unix utility program for sending and receiving mail, also known as a Mail User Agent program. Being a console application with a command syntax similar to ed, it is the POSIX standardized variant of the Berkeley Mail utility.

See also 
 mail (Unix)

References

External links 
 
 History of mail and mailx from the Heirloom Project
 mailx Tutorial from the engineering Dpt. at Purdue University
  at GNU Mailutils manual
 S-nail  manual

Unix SUS2008 utilities
Email client software for Linux
Unix Internet software
Free email software
Console applications
Software using the BSD license